Elaphidion bidens is a species of beetle in the family Cerambycidae. It was described by Johan Christian Fabricius in 1787.

References

bidens
Beetles described in 1787
Taxa named by Johan Christian Fabricius